Five ships of the Royal Navy have been named HMS Halcyon. The term Halcyon originates from the Greek myth of Alcyone and means golden or marked by peace and prosperity.

 The first HMS Halcyon was the French 16-gun brig-sloop , which  captured in 1803; Halcyon was broken up 1812.
 The second  was an 18-gun  launched in 1813 and wrecked the following year in Jamaica.
 The fourth  was a paddle minesweeper in service from 1916 to 1921.
She was launched in 1933 and sold for scrapping in 1950.

References

Royal Navy ship names